Eric Boocock (born 28 February 1945 in Dewsbury, Yorkshire, England) is a former Speedway rider who appeared in three Speedway World Championship finals.

Career
Eric Boocock started his career with the Middlesbrough Bears in 1961 and stayed there until the promotion closed in 1964. The promoter, Reg Fearman opened up a speedway track at The Shay in Halifax and moved his Middlesbrough riders there, to form the Halifax Dukes. Erik Boocock spent his entire career with the Dukes, winning the British League and the KO Cup in 1966. He made three World final appearances and appeared with brother Nigel Boocock in the 1970 Speedway World Pairs Championship finals, finishing in third place. He was also a regular England International rider.

He became British Champion in 1974 after finishing on the rostrum three times previously. The same season he became the first rider to gain a testimonial meeting for his services to speedway and then retired as a racer at the early age of twenty-nine. He appeared again briefly for the Halifax Dukes in 1983 but retired shortly after.

Manager and promoter
In 1975, he became team manager of the Belle Vue Aces, where he stayed for seven seasons. In 1976, he also helped Peter Collins win the Speedway World Championship by stripping, cleaning and rebuilding his clutch between heats in the final. In 1980, he became coach of England, with Ian Thomas as team manager, winning the World Team Cup and the Speedway World Pairs Championship, and with Michael Lee also becoming World Champion. In 1982, he had a season as England team manager, and in 1986, he was appointed joint manager with Colin Pratt, with whom he spent seven years at the helm.

In 2004, he became co-promoter of the Hull Vikings, and they won the Premier League, the Knock-Out Cup and the Craven Shield. He then went on to be team manager the Belle Vue Aces with Chris Morton. In 2008, he became co-promoter and manager at the Sheffield Tigers. He has served several terms on the British Speedway Promoters' Association management committee.

World Final Appearances

Individual World Championship
 1967 –  London, Wembley Stadium – 7th – 9pts
 1971 –  Göteborg, Ullevi – 11th – 4pts
 1972 –  London, Wembley Stadium – 15th – 2pts

World Pairs Championship
 1970 –  Malmö, Malmö Stadion (with Nigel Boocock) – 3rd – 19pts (13)

World Team Cup
 1967 –  Malmö, Malmö Stadion (with Ray Wilson / Barry Briggs / Ivan Mauger / Colin Pratt) – 3rd= – 19pts (5)
 1970 –  London, Wembley Stadium (with Ivan Mauger / Barry Briggs / Nigel Boocock / Ray Wilson) – 2nd – 31pts (5)

References

1945 births
Living people
British speedway riders
English motorcycle racers
Sportspeople from Dewsbury
Speedway promoters
British Speedway Championship winners
Halifax Dukes riders
Middlesbrough Bears riders
Long Eaton Archers riders